Khao Tha Phet is a hill near the city of Surat Thani in Southern Thailand. It is located in Makham Tia Subdistrict, Surat Thani City. The hill has an altitude of about 210 m (689 ft) above sea level and offers a good view over the city.

On top of the hill is the Si Surat stupa (also known by its common name Phra That Khao Tha Phet), a Srivijavan-style stupa built in 1957. The stupa contains a Buddha relic donated by India. Next to the stupa is a Sweet Shorea tree (Shorea roxburghii) planted by King Bhumibol Adulyadej.

Due to its height over the city, several TV and radio transmitters are located on the hill. A portion of the hill, around 4.65 km² (1.86 sq. miles) in size, was designated a protected non-hunting area on July 26, 1977.

See also
List of mountains in Thailand

External links
National Park, Wildlife and Plant Conservation Department (Thai)
Royal Gazette Issue 94 chapter 68 of June 26 1977 (Thai)

Citations 

Non-hunting areas of Thailand
Geography of Surat Thani province